During the 2004–05 Dutch football season, AZ Alkmaar competed in the Eredivisie.

Season summary
AZ reached the UEFA Cup semi-finals, the farthest they had progressed in Europe since winning the UEFA Cup in 1981.

First-team squad
Squad at end of season

Left club during season

Transfers

In
  Kew Jaliens -  Willem II
  Joris Mathijsen -  Willem II
  Tarik Sektioui -  Willem II

Out

Results

UEFA Cup

First round
 P.A.O.K. 2-3 AZ
 AZ 1-1 P.A.O.K.

Group stage
 AZ 2–0 Auxerre
 Amica Wronki 1–3 AZ
 AZ 1–0 Rangers
 Grazer AK 2–0 AZ

Round of 32
 Alemannia Aachen 0-0 AZ
 AZ 2-1 Alemannia Aachen

Round of 16
 Shakhtar Donetsk 1-3 AZ
 AZ 2-1 Shakhtar Donetsk

Quarter-finals
 Villarreal 1-2 AZ
 AZ 1-1 Villarreal

Semi-finals

References

AZ Alkmaar seasons
AZ Alkmaar